Chacha Bhatija is an Indian cartoon television series that aired on Hungama TV. It focuses on a detective duo of an uncle and his nephew, who are named Chacha (Bhatija's uncle) and Bhatija (Chacha's nephew) solving mysteries in the fictional town of Funtoosh Nagar with the help of their friends, Bandookni (a policewoman), Khalla, and Khoji Singh (an inventor and scientist). While Chacha is the comedian and strength of the gang, Bhatija is the brains of it. The show is based on the comics of the same name by Diamond Comics. The series stars Swapnil Kumari as Chacha and Anil Datt as Bhatija.

Movies 
 Chacha Bhatija: Khazane Ki Khoj
 Chacha Bhatija: Golmaal Hai Bhai Sab Golmaal Hai

References

2016 Indian television series debuts
2017 Indian television series endings
Indian children's animated comedy television series
Animated detective television series
Hungama TV original programming
Disney XD (Indian TV channel) original programming
Television shows based on comics